The 2018 Nationals was the 48th Men's Open & Open and Women's Nationals.  The Nationals was a team handball tournament to determined the National Champion from 2018 from the US.

Final ranking

Men's Elite ranking

Men's Open ranking

Women's Open ranking

References

External links
 Tournament Results

USA Team Handball Nationals by year
Sports in Myrtle Beach, South Carolina